Alan McLeary (born 6 October 1964) is an English football former defender. He spent the majority of his career at Millwall, but also had spells at Charlton Athletic and Bristol City, as well as loan spells at Sheffield United and Wimbledon.

In 1998, McLeary was appointed assistant manager at Millwall, and in May 1999, he was promoted to co-manager alongside longtime teammate Keith Stevens. The duo were sacked in September 2000. He later had a short spell as caretaker manager at Millwall following the departure of David Tuttle at the end of the 2005–06 season.

References

External links

Living people
1964 births
Footballers from Lambeth
Association football defenders
English footballers
English football managers
Millwall F.C. players
Sheffield United F.C. players
Wimbledon F.C. players
Charlton Athletic F.C. players
Bristol City F.C. players
Millwall F.C. managers
Premier League players
England under-21 international footballers